La casa chica (English: The Little House) is a 1950 Mexican drama film directed by Roberto Gavaldón and starring Dolores del Río.

Plot
Fernando Mendoza, an eminent doctor, falls in love with Amalia, a sweet woman that fully reciprocates. But Fernando is engaged to marry Lucila, a frivolous woman who uses a thousand wiles to keep him.

Over the years, the stormy relationship between Fernando and Amalia becomes more complicated. She finishes her medical studies and becomes a very prestigious scientist. Amalia agrees to become Fernando's lover and collaborates with him in his laboratory as his "assistant". They share an apartment, "the house of the other", where they enjoy their pure and sincere love.

Cast
 Dolores del Río as Amalia Estrada
 Roberto Cañedo as Dr. Fernando Mendoza
 Miroslava as Lucila del Castillo
 Domingo Soler as Professor Alfaro
 María Douglas as Nelly Gutiérrez

References

External links 
 
 La casa chica on FilmAffinity.com

1950 films
1950 drama films
Mexican drama films
1950s Spanish-language films
Films directed by Roberto Gavaldón
Mexican black-and-white films
1950s Mexican films